Ark International School (ARKIS) is an English Medium School located at Begusarai, Bihar, India. The school is established, owned and run by the Jesus Educational and Social Upliftment Society.

References

External links

ARKIS Official website
ARKIS Official Facebook Page

International schools in India
Schools in Bihar
Begusarai
Educational institutions established in 2015
2015  establishments in Bihar